Daisies is a 1966 Czechoslovakian surrealist comedy-drama film written and directed by Věra Chytilová.

Regarded as a milestone of the Czechoslovak New Wave movement, it follows two young women (Jitka Cerhová and Ivana Karbanová), both named Marie, who engage in strange pranks. Originally planned as a satire of bourgeois decadence, the movie targets those attached to rules and was referred to by Chytilová as "a necrologue about a negative way of life." Daisies also inverts the stereotypical ideas of women and redraws them to the heroines' advantage. The film is considered critical of authoritarianism, communism and patriarchy, and it was banned from theaters or export in the Czechoslovak Socialist Republic.

Plot
The title sequence intersperses shots of a spinning flywheel with shots of airplanes strafing and bombing the ground.

The first scene shows Marie I and Marie II sitting in bathing suits. Creaking sounds accompany their movements and their conversation is robotic. They decide that, since the whole world is spoiled, they will be spoiled as well.

The Maries dance in front of a tree that has many different types of fruit on it. Marie II eats a peach from the tree and the Maries appear in their apartment.

Marie I goes on a date with an older man. Marie II shows up, saying she is Marie I's sister, and eats a lot of food while mocking the date and interfering with his amorous intentions. She asks when the man's train is leaving, and the trio go to the train station. Marie I gets on the train with the man before sneaking off and going home with Marie II.

The Maries go to a Prague nightclub where they upstage a 1920s-style dancing couple's floor show and annoy the patrons with their drunken antics.

Marie II attempts suicide by filling their apartment with gas, but fails because she left the window open. Marie I chastises her for wasting gas.

The Maries flirt with another man to get him to pay for their meal before seeing him off on his train. They cry when he leaves, but then break into laughter.

Marie II goes to the apartment of a man who collects butterflies. He repeatedly declares his love to her, but she just asks if there is any food around. The Maries rob a friendly female bathroom attendant.

Back at their apartment, they cut up various phallic foods while the butterfly collector declares his love for Marie II over the telephone.

When the Maries try to send off a much older man on a train, he gets off, so they board the moving train and end up leaving him at the station.

The Maries look at all of the names and phone numbers written on the walls of their apartment and try to pick a man to call. A man knocks on the door for Marie II, but Marie I teases her and she does not let him in. At a pool, each Marie tells the other that she does not like her anymore.

At their apartment, the Maries soak in a bathtub full of milk and philosophize about life and death, existence and non-existence.

In the country, a farmer fails to notice the Maries. When a group of workers riding by on bicycles ignore them, Marie II begins to wonder if they have disappeared. They decide they must exist when they pass a mess they made with stolen ears of corn. Back in their apartment, they cut each other apart with scissors.

The Maries sneak into the basement of a building. They take a mechanical dumbwaiter up several floors and find a feast that is all laid out, though no one is around. They eat the food, make a mess, and destroy the room. They swing from a chandelier, which falls from the ceiling, and are dropped into open water. They call out to a nearby boat for help, and unseen sailors reach out large logs for the Maries to grab onto. They are repeatedly lifted and dunked back in the water before they lose their grip. They say they do not want to be spoiled anymore.

The final scene shows the Maries returning to the dining room. They sweep off the soiled tablecloth, set the table with shards of plates and broken glasses, and pour the food back onto platters, while whispering about being good and hardworking so everything will be wonderful and they will be happy. When they finish, they lie on the table and say they are happy. Marie II asks Marie I to repeat this, and Marie I asks if they are pretending. Marie II says they are not. The chandelier falls on them and the film cuts to war footage, over which appears a statement dedicating the film "to those who get upset only over a stomped-upon bed of lettuce."

Cast
 Ivana Karbanová as Marie II (the blonde)
 Jitka Cerhová as Marie I (the brunette)
 Marie Češková as Woman in the Bathroom
 Jiřina Myšková as Toilet Assistant
 Marcela Březinová as Toilet Assistant
 Julius Albert as Older Playboy
 Oldřich Hora as Playboy
 Jan Klusák as Younger Playboy
 Josef Koníček as Dancer
 Jaromír Vomáčka as Happy Gentleman

At the time of production, neither Karbanová nor Cerhová were professional actresses, the former being a salesclerk and the latter a student. Co-writer Ester Krumbachová described the protagonists as "a pair of silly young girls but they could just as well have been two generals."

Themes and style
Throughout the film, the two main characters serve as hyperbolical pawns for Chytilová's satirical approach to female stereotypes. There is a tangible anti-patriarchy sentiment in the film, observed through the two Maries' interactions with the men in their lives. Chytilová's extensive use of the "doll" metaphor is a means to show a male-dominated society's absurd expectations of women by overplaying their stereotypical attributions. In the beginning of the film, we see Marie 1 and Marie 2 sitting down and as they move, we hear creaking sounds as if coming from an unoiled hinge. The opening establishes the metaphor of the women behaving as marionettes. A further use of the metaphor is depicting the protagonists as shallow and empty creatures, devoid of any human quality. Usually observed in sexist narratives, women are portrayed as lesser beings and by blowing these assumptions out of proportion, Chytilová aims to show the absurdity of the "patriarchal idea of femininity". Film writer Ela Bittencourt notes that Chytilová uses "the stereotype of how women are often infantilized and as a weapon right here in this film".

The heroines as "infantilized women" with high-tone voices and their childish mannerisms is what is "expected of them" by the men in their lives as they do not realize the deliberate act both women put on.

The film was state-approved and had limitations in its production. Many conservative supporters of the communist regime in Czechoslovakia criticized the film for its appropriation of gluttony and the alleged support it shows for the heroines. In an era of the communist regime in Czechoslovakia, Chytilová was "accused of nihilism” at the time of the release of Daisies. The film was condemned to be unfit for the socialist ideas of the time. A visiting professor at Staffordshire University and author of The Czechoslovak New Wave, Peter Hames commented that the officials "objected primarily to its avant-garde form, the fact that the girls didn’t provide a moral example, and they no doubt correctly saw it as an attack on establishment values". The food-fights and immense consumerism that Marie 1 and Marie 2 instigate were believed to be unrepresentative of the political agenda of the state.

The film has little plot structure, scenes proceed from one to the next chaotically, frequently switching between black and white, color, and filtered or tinted footage. These stylistic choices in Daisies tie back to some of its themes. Both women are seen to generate destruction anywhere they go and this is reflected in the editing and montaging of the film. This kind of editing and collage-work may also indicate the multi-facedness of the marionettes, not as the simple creatures that patriarchal societies may make them out to be.

Reception

Domestic
The film was positively received by Czech audiences and critics. Film critic Antonín J. Liehm wrote that Daisies was "a remarkable film not only for the viewers that appreciate its artistic significance, but also for those who just want to be entertained and might miss its magnitude on the first viewing". Author Milan Kundera called the film "masterly made" and wrote that the "monstrosity of the main characters was depicted elegantly, poetically, dreamlike and beautifully, but without becoming any less monstrous".

The Czech Film and Television Union awarded it the Trilobit Award for Best Czechoslovak movie of 1966. However, after being criticized by the communist MP Jaroslav Pružinec during interpellations in May 1967, the film was pulled from all major cinemas for "depicting the wanton" and was subsequently only screened in smaller venues.

International
The film was very well received in Europe. French journalist Pierre Billard, writing for L'Express, compared Daisies to Mack Sennett and Marx Brothers movies and called it "a grand celebration of absurdities with technical finesse and marvellous art direction so rarely achieved".

In the American press, the reception was mostly negative. Bosley Crowther described it in The New York Times as a "Pretentiously kookie and laboriously overblown mod farce about two playgirls who are thoroughly emptyheaded. Its stabs at humor and satire simply don't cut." New Zealander freelance film critic Carmen Gray directly addressed Crowther's assessment 55 years later by writing, "What he failed to recognize was that, under patriarchal and totalitarian oppression, clearing one’s own mind can be a radical act of deprogramming." Gray also explained that the end title "takes aim at the hypocrisy of censuring such a spectacle while turning a blind eye to much graver abuses of power," the referenced spectacle being the scene involving both Maries trashing a feast.

It is the highest ranked Czech film in They Shoot Pictures Don't They, an aggregator of critic best-of lists. It was also ranked the sixth greatest film directed by a woman in a 2019 BBC poll.

Awards
Trilobit Award for the Best Czechoslovak movie of 1966.
Grand Prix of the Belgian Film Critics Association for the best movie of 1968

See also 
 The Color of Pomegranates

Notes

References

External links
 
 Daisies at Turner Classic Movies
 Daisies: Giggling Generals; One and Two an essay by Carmen Gray at The Criterion Collection
 Essay by Michael Koresky at the Criterion Collection
 Trailer of the film in Art Days

1960s Czech-language films
1960s feminist films
1960s female buddy films
1960s satirical films
1966 films
1966 comedy-drama films
Censored films
Czech comedy-drama films
Czech satirical films
Czechoslovak comedy-drama films
Films about food and drink
Films directed by Věra Chytilová
Films with screenplays by Pavel Juráček
Obscenity controversies in film
Psychedelic films